Live Europe '83 is a 1984 live album by Joan Baez, taken from performances during her previous year's tour. It found Baez beginning to update her image (which she would continue to do on subsequent releases) by including songs like "Children of the Eighties" (her own composition, written for the children born after the 1960s) alongside old fan favorites like "A Hard Rain's a-Gonna Fall" and "Farewell Angelina". She subsequently rewrote some of the lyrics of "Warriors of the Sun", as can be heard on the version of the song that appears on 1989's Speaking of Dreams. The album was not released in the US, due to Baez's lack of a US recording contract at the time. The German version of the album substituted the German songs "Wozu sind Kriege da" and "Wenn unsere Brüder kommen" for the album's two French songs. It was also released in Canada on the Gamma label, and it was the Canadian version that most US fans purchased as an import.

Track listing

German edition

Canadian edition

Certifications and sales

References

Joan Baez live albums
1984 live albums